Naseeb (also spelled Nesib, Nasib or Nasip) is an Arabic term used in many languages including Indonesian, Malay, Persian, Turkish, Pashto, Sindhi, Somali, Urdu, Hindi, Gujarati, Bengali and Punjabi it means destiny or fate. The literal meaning in Arabic is "share", but it came to be understood as "one's share in life", and thus their destiny. It may refer to:

Film
Nasib (1945 film), a Bollywood film of 1945
 Naseeb (1981 film), a Hindi film
 Naseeb (1994 film), see Shaan Shahid filmography
 Naseeb (1997 film), a Hindi film

Literature
 Nasīb (poetry), a literary form usually constituting an amatory prelude to a qaṣīdah

Places
 Nasib, Syria, a town in the Daraa Governorate of Syria
 Nasib Border Crossing, a border crossing between Syria and Jordan

People

Given name
 Naseeb Saliba (1915–2008), Armenian construction mogul

Middle name
 Fateh Naseeb Khan (1890–1933), Indian military commander
 Habib Nasib Nader (born 1979), British actor
 Mohammed Naseeb Qureshy (1933–2005), Indian scientist

Surname
 Lotfi Nasib (1926–2011), Finnish ice hockey player

See also
Nassib, given name and surname